HMS Agincourt was a 64-gun third-rate ship of the line of the Royal Navy, launched on 23 July 1796 at Blackwall Yard, London. The Admiralty bought her on the stocks from the East India Company in 1796, who had called her Earl Talbot.

Agincourt served in the navy's Egyptian campaign between 8 March 1801 and 2 September, which qualified her officers and crew for the clasp "Egypt" to the Naval General Service Medal that the Admiralty authorized in 1850 to all surviving claimants.

She was decommissioned in 1809 and converted to a troop ship on 6 January 1812 under the name HMS Bristol.

Fate
Bristol was sold on 15 December 1814 on condition that she be broken up immediately. She sold for £4,510.

Notes

Citations

References
 
Lavery, Brian (2003) The Ship of the Line - Volume 1: The development of the battlefleet 1650–1850. Conway Maritime Press. .

External links

Ships of the line of the Royal Navy
1796 ships
Ships built by the Blackwall Yard
Ships of the British East India Company